Pyractomena angulata is a species of firefly in the family of beetles known as Lampyridae. It is found in North America and is the state insect of Indiana. It is also known as Say's Firefly and the Angle Candled Firefly.

Like all Pyractomena, it has an amber-colored bioluminescence. It inhabits wetlands and is visible between May and mid-July.

References

Further reading

External links

 

Lampyridae
Bioluminescent insects
Articles created by Qbugbot
Beetles described in 1825
Symbols of Indiana